"Yesterday Was Just the Beginning of My Life" is a song written by Vanda & Young and recorded by New Zealand-born singer songwriter, Mark Williams. The song was released in May 1975 as the second and final single from his debut studio album, Mark Williams (1975). The song peaked at number 1 on the New Zealand charts and was the highest selling single by a New Zealand artist in New Zealand in 1975.

Background
Williams' manager and music producer, Alan Galbraith had chosen a rock-pop number written by Australian songwriting duo Harry Vanda and George Young (aka Vanda & Young). Williams originally wasn't keen on the track, but backed down and recorded the song with an alternate rearrangement with a rhythm and blues-soul sound. Galbraith said, "The original demo was nothing like the end result."

Track listing
 7" single (EMI – HR 538)
Side A: "Yesterday Was Just the Beginning of My Life"
Side B: "Jimmy Loves Marianne"

Chart performance

Weekly charts

Year-end charts

See also
 List of number-one singles in 1975 (New Zealand)
 New Zealand Top 40 singles of 1975

References

1975 singles
1975 songs
Mark Williams (singer) songs
Number-one singles in New Zealand
Songs written by Harry Vanda
Songs written by George Young (rock musician)
EMI Records singles